Csongrád (archaically also Црноград/Crnograd) is a town in Csongrád County in southern Hungary.

History
At the time of the Hungarian Conquest (the end of 9th century) the Maros Valley was under Bulgarian control. The fortress was known as Chorniy Grad (Slavic term for 'black castle') and served as a Bulgarian-Slavic guard outpost. Later King Stephen (1000–1038) made the town a state administration center, giving its name to a county. It remained a county seat till the Mongol invasion of Hungary (1240–42). The town and fortress were badly damaged by the Mongols; king Béla IV subsequently transferred the county seat to Szeged in 1247. The move significantly affected Csongrád's recovery. It did not become a town again until 1920.

Main sights

The Main Square obtained its definitive shape in the first half of the 10th century, its streets are wide with many trees. The Main Street is lined by old plane trees.

The road running along the grammar school in Secessionist style leads to the old town. This part of the settlement, called Öregvár (meaning Old Castle), preserves the structure of a Hungarian fishing-village of the 18th century. The adobes and houses with puddle wall have thatched roofs, many of them are equipped inside with modern furniture. One building can be seen with original furniture (at Gyökér utca 1).

The Tisza has a sand-bank which looks like a seashore.

Another attraction of Csongrád is the backwater generated by the river control works (Holt-Tisza), which houses several water-birds. In the wood strip on the left bank of the Tisza are the uncovered ruins of a Benedictine monastery founded in the 11th century.

Tourism
The greatest attraction in Csongrád is the Tisza river bank. The river has a sandy beach and during summer hundreds of people come to bathe in the water. Csongrád has spas and some swimming pools as well, both indoor and outdoor.

Csongrád's museums include:
 Csongrád's traditional style house
 László Tari Museum 
 István Széchenyi Elementary School's collection of the region
 Gallery of Csongrád
 Művésztelep (Artists' park)

The permanent exhibition of the museum located in the center of the city awaits the visitors by presenting a material of town history. Less than hundred meters away from here the City Gallery can be found, where from time to time periodical exhibition of the Gallery the aquarelles of the painter-artist of Csongrád, János Piroska representing the brilliant technique of color-runout as light as air are shown.

There are several churches in Csongrád:
 The Nagyboldogasszony (Holy Virgin) Church - situated in the main town square and built between 1762–69
 Saint Rókus-church
 Piroskavárosi Saint Joseph Church Franciscan Abbey

There are two main festivals in the summer time:
 Csongrád Wine Festival, which is usually last for 3–4 days
 Körös-Toroki Days which lasts for a week

Notable people
Miloš Crnjanski, Serbian writer
Geca Kon, Serbian publisher
Pál Maléter, military leader
Károly Csemegi, judge

Twin towns – sister cities

Csongrád is twinned with:

 Bečej, Serbia
 Bełchatów, Poland

 Breuilaufa, France
 Le Buis, France
 Chamboret, France
 Chaptelat, France
 Nantiat, France
 Nieul, France
 Raisio, Finland
 Saint-Jouvent, France
 Thouron, France
 Vaulry, France

Csongrád also cooperates with Berehove, Ukraine.

Gallery

References

Further reading
István Sebestyén (1996): A Glance at Csongrád. Csongrád a vizek és a parkok városa. Raszter Kft. Kiadó, Csongrád, Hungary

External links

Official website (in Hungarian)
Körös-Torok (in Hungarian)
List of churches in Csongrád (in Hungarian)
László Tari Museum (in Hungarian)
Csongrád town Events Calendar  (in Hungarian)
Csongrád at funiq.hu

Populated places in Csongrád-Csanád County

et:Csongrádi komitaat